Henri Van Severen-Ente was a famous gold-embroiderer from Sint-Niklaas. His works for clergy and important churches are of fine quality.

Van Severen was a son of Jean-Baptiste, who established the Van Severen-Manufacture ca 1830. During his youth he left his father's factory to go to Rome as papal zouave. His father died in 1871, and he became a master-embroiderer.

His works are typically neogothical, and his procession banners are famous for their size and quality. He specialised in important restorations of old vestments.

When he died in 1923 his widow, Emma Ente, continued the work until her death.

Medals 
 Silver Medal: 1885 Exposition of Antwerp
 Gold Medal: 1888 Exposition of Barcelona
 Gold Medal: 1888 Exposition of Brussels
 Gold Medal: 1888 Exposiotion of London
 Grand Prix: 1910 Exposition of Brussels

References

External links

 Severen-Ente workshop in ODIS - Online Database for Intermediary Structures 
 Archives of Severen-Ente workshop in ODIS - Online Database for Intermediary Structures 

Papal Zouaves
People from Sint-Niklaas
Belgian Roman Catholics
Embroiderers
19th-century Belgian artists
19th-century Belgian male artists
20th-century Belgian artists